Beyhaq Rural District is a rural district (dehestan) in Sheshtomad County, Razavi Khorasan province, Iran. At the 2006 census, its population was 7,417, in 2,237 families.  The rural district has 27 villages.

References 

Rural Districts of Razavi Khorasan Province
Sabzevar County